Lazarou may refer to:

 Lefteris Lazarou (born 1952), Greek chef
 Maria Lazarou (born 1972), Greek football player
 Papa Lazarou, a character from BBC TV's The League of Gentlemen

See also
 Lazzaro (disambiguation)
 Lazarus (disambiguation)